The Second Assembly of Frashër was one of the regional assemblies organized by the League of Prizren. It was held in Frashër in June 1880. It was attended by representatives of  settlements with Albanian population which administratively were part of the vilayets of Ioannina and Manastir. The assembly had as central goal addressing the risk of partition of lands with Albanian populations among neighbouring countries. Among other things, the participants agreed on a proposal to form a central national government which would be formed by the General Assembly of the League of Prizren.

See also
 Congress of Dibra
 Congress of Manastir

References

Ottoman Albania
Albanian National Awakening